The 2nd parallel south is a circle of latitude that is 2 degrees south of the Earth's equatorial plane. It crosses the Atlantic Ocean, Africa, the Indian Ocean, Southeast Asia, Australasia, the Pacific Ocean and South America.

Around the world
Starting at the prime meridian and heading eastwards, the parallel 2° south passes through:

{| class="wikitable plainrowheaders"
! scope="col" width="120" | Co-ordinates
! scope="col" | Country, territory or sea
! scope="col" | Notes
|-
| style="background:#b0e0e6;" | 
! scope="row" style="background:#b0e0e6;" | Atlantic Ocean
| style="background:#b0e0e6;" |
|-
| 
! scope="row" | Gabon
|
|-
| 
! scope="row" | Republic of the Congo
|
|-
| 
! scope="row" | Gabon
|
|-
| 
! scope="row" | Republic of the Congo
|
|-
| 
! scope="row" | Democratic Republic of the Congo
| The border with Rwanda is in Lake Kivu
|-
| 
! scope="row" | Rwanda
| Passing just south of Kigali
|-
| 
! scope="row" | Tanzania
| Passing through Lake Victoria, including Ukerewe Island
|-
| 
! scope="row" | Kenya
|
|-
| style="background:#b0e0e6;" | 
! scope="row" style="background:#b0e0e6;" | Indian Ocean
| style="background:#b0e0e6;" |
|-
| 
! scope="row" | Indonesia
| A small island just north of the island of Sipura
|-
| style="background:#b0e0e6;" | 
! scope="row" style="background:#b0e0e6;" | Mentawai Strait
| style="background:#b0e0e6;" |
|-
| 
! scope="row" | Indonesia
| Island of Sumatra
|-
| style="background:#b0e0e6;" | 
! scope="row" style="background:#b0e0e6;" | Bangka Strait
| style="background:#b0e0e6;" |
|-
| 
! scope="row" | Indonesia
| Island of Bangka
|-
| style="background:#b0e0e6;" | 
! scope="row" style="background:#b0e0e6;" | Karimata Strait
| style="background:#b0e0e6;" |
|-
| 
! scope="row" | Indonesia
| Island of BorneoWest KalimantanCentral KalimantanSouth KalimantanEast Kalimantan
|-
| style="background:#b0e0e6;" | 
! scope="row" style="background:#b0e0e6;" | Makassar Strait
| style="background:#b0e0e6;" |
|-
| 
! scope="row" | Indonesia
| Island of Sulawesi
|-
| style="background:#b0e0e6;" | 
! scope="row" style="background:#b0e0e6;" | Banda Sea
| style="background:#b0e0e6;" |
|-
| 
! scope="row" | Indonesia
| Island of Salue Besar in the Banggai archipelago
|-
| style="background:#b0e0e6;" | 
! scope="row" style="background:#b0e0e6;" | Banda Sea
| style="background:#b0e0e6;" |
|-
| 
! scope="row" | Indonesia
| Islands of Seho and Taliabu
|-
| style="background:#b0e0e6;" | 
! scope="row" style="background:#b0e0e6;" | Banda Sea
| style="background:#b0e0e6;" | Passing just south of the island of Mangole, Indonesia
|-
| 
! scope="row" | Indonesia
| Island of Sanana
|-
| style="background:#b0e0e6;" | 
! scope="row" style="background:#b0e0e6;" | Ceram Sea
| style="background:#b0e0e6;" | Passing just south of the island of Gomumu, Indonesia
|-
| 
! scope="row" | Indonesia
| Island of Misool
|-
| style="background:#b0e0e6;" | 
! scope="row" style="background:#b0e0e6;" | Ceram Sea
| style="background:#b0e0e6;" |
|-
| 
! scope="row" | Indonesia
| Islands of New Guinea and Meos Waar
|-
| style="background:#b0e0e6;" | 
! scope="row" style="background:#b0e0e6;" | Cenderawasih Bay
| style="background:#b0e0e6;" | Passing just south of the island of Yapen, Indonesia
|-
| 
! scope="row" | Indonesia
| Island of New Guinea
|-
| style="background:#b0e0e6;" | 
! scope="row" style="background:#b0e0e6;" | Pacific Ocean
| style="background:#b0e0e6;" | Passing just south of the Ninigo Islands, Papua New Guinea
|-
| 
! scope="row" | Papua New Guinea
| Island of Manus
|-
| style="background:#b0e0e6;" | 
! scope="row" style="background:#b0e0e6;" | Seeadler Harbour
| style="background:#b0e0e6;" |
|-
| 
! scope="row" | Papua New Guinea
| Los Negros Island
|-valign="top"
| style="background:#b0e0e6;" | 
! scope="row" style="background:#b0e0e6;" | Pacific Ocean
| style="background:#b0e0e6;" | Passing just north of Tong Island, Papua New Guinea Passing just south of Onotoa atoll, Kiribati
|-
| 
! scope="row" | Ecuador
| Passing just north of Guayaquil
|-
| 
! scope="row" | Peru
|
|-
| 
! scope="row" | Colombia
|
|-valign="top"
| 
! scope="row" | Brazil
| Amazonas Pará Maranhão - passing just north of São Luís
|-
| style="background:#b0e0e6;" | 
! scope="row" style="background:#b0e0e6;" | Atlantic Ocean
| style="background:#b0e0e6;" |
|-
|}

See also
1st parallel south
3rd parallel south

s02